Peter Sternad (8 February 1946 – 22 November 2022) was an Austrian athlete. He competed in the men's hammer throw at the 1972 Summer Olympics and the 1976 Summer Olympics.

References

1946 births
2022 deaths
Athletes (track and field) at the 1972 Summer Olympics
Athletes (track and field) at the 1976 Summer Olympics
Austrian male hammer throwers
Olympic athletes of Austria
Sportspeople from Villach